Joh Keun-shik (born 1968) is a South Korean film director and screenwriter. Joh debuted with Conduct Zero (2002), a creative and interesting comedy, as well as a box-office hit. His second feature Once in a Summer (2006), which displays his nostalgia and warm approach to directing, clinched Best Film, Best Director and Best Supporting Actor (for Oh Dal-su) at the 15th Chunsa Film Art Awards in 2007.

His latest film is the South Korean-Chinese romantic comedy My New Sassy Girl (2016), which is a sequel to My Sassy Girl (2001), also starred Cha Tae-hyun as the male lead.

Personal life 
A graduate from the film department of Seoul Institute of the Arts, Jo majored in directing at the Korean Academy of Film Arts.

Filmography 
Seventeen (short film, 1997) - cinematographer
Free To Fly (short film, 1997) - cinematographer
Wan-Na-Be (short film, 1998) - director, editor, cinematographer
Lies (2000) - assistant director
Interview (2000) - actor
Conduct Zero (2002) - director, writer
Twentidentity (short film: "Secrets and Lies", 2004) - actor
Once in a Summer (2006) - director, screenwriter
Wish (2009) - directing department
My New Sassy Girl (2016) - director

Awards 
2007 15th Chunsa Film Art Awards: Best Director (Once in a Summer)

References

External links 
 
 
 

1968 births
Living people
South Korean film directors
South Korean screenwriters
Seoul Institute of the Arts alumni